Florence Lasserre-David (born 29 June 1974) is a French politician of the Democratic Movement (MoDem) who has been serving as a member of the French National Assembly since the 2017 elections, representing the department of Pyrénées-Atlantiques.

Political career
In parliament, Lasserre-David serves on the Committee on Sustainable Development and Spatial Planning. In addition to her committee assignments, she is part of the French-Laos Parliamentary Friendship Group.

Political positions
In July 2019, Lasserre-David voted in favour of the French ratification of the European Union’s Comprehensive Economic and Trade Agreement (CETA) with Canada.

Personal life
Lasserre-David is the daughter of Senator Jean-Jacques Lasserre.

References

Living people
Deputies of the 15th National Assembly of the French Fifth Republic
Democratic Movement (France) politicians
1974 births
Deputies of the 16th National Assembly of the French Fifth Republic
Members of Parliament for Pyrénées-Atlantiques